Section 13 may refer to:

Section 13 of the Canadian Charter of Rights and Freedoms
Section 13 of the Canadian Human Rights Act
A spy group in the 2000-2005 animated series Jackie Chan Adventures